Paul Crawford may refer to:

 Paul Crawford (academic) (born 1963), English academic and writer
 Paul Crawford (composer) (born 1947), Canadian composer, radio producer, organist, and music educator
 Paul Crawford (jazz musician) (1925–1996), American jazz musician, music arranger, and music historian